Nonna Valentinovna Grishayeva (born 21 July 1971) is a Soviet and Russian actress of theater, film and television, master parody, TV presenter and singer. She's associated with Honored Artist of Russia (2006).

Biography
She lives and works in Moscow.

Filmography

References

External links 
 
 Official Website of Nonna Grishayeva

1971 births
Living people
Actors from Odesa
Soviet film actresses
Russian film actresses
Soviet stage actresses
Russian stage actresses
Russian television actresses
Russian voice actresses
Soviet actresses
20th-century Russian actresses
21st-century Russian actresses
Russian women comedians
21st-century Russian singers
21st-century Russian women singers